Neoregelia is a genus of epiphytic flowering plants in the family Bromeliaceae, subfamily Bromelioideae, native to South American rainforests. The genus name is for Eduard August von Regel, Director of St. Petersburg Botanic Gardens in Russia (1875–1892).

Description
Neoregelias are epiphytic plants, meaning they grow attached to the branches of forest trees; they do not naturally grow in the Earth, though they can be cultivated on the ground in controlled conditions, such as a garden, provided they are kept in a very airy growing medium such as pine bark that allows the root system to breathe. Their roots serve primarily as hold-fasts to grip their canopy perches and are adapted poorly to absorb nutriment, which is instead obtained through leaf litter, animal droppings and rainfall that collects in the prominent central cup exhibited by most species in the genus. They have mostly broad, relatively flat leaves often marked brightly with red, purple or yellow pigments which serve to protect the green photosynthetic tissues from sunburn and through selective breeding and hybridization thousands of cultivars in almost all color combinations, many also striped with white, have been produced.

The inflorescences of these plants form in the shallow central depression - the "cup" - of the plant, which often fills partway with water, through which the flowers bloom. Neoregelias, like most bromeliads, bloom only once in their lifetime and then begin to die, but normally not before producing several pups - small clones of the parent plant - around the central flowering rosette on stolons. These offshoots eventually replace the mother plant and form a cluster around it - although in cultivation, the offshoots can be severed and replanted when about two-thirds the size of the adult plant. The leaves immediately surrounding the inflorescence are very often brightly colored, even in species otherwise not brightly marked - an adaptation to attract pollinating insects.

Cultivation
Neoregelia bromeliads and their hybrids, due to their varied forms and beautiful colors, are commonly cultivated as houseplants, or in warm climates as landscape plants. They are particularly suitable for vivarium culture. Their needs are simple, mainly consisting of bright light (most forms will revert to green if lighting is sub-optimal) and an airy growing medium - some species do not do well in soil and will be prone to rot due to their nature as epiphytes.

In temperate regions where temperatures fall below , they must be grown under glass or as houseplants. There are over 5000 registered cultivars.

Symbiosis
Neoregelias are utilized by many species of poison dart frog to reproduce. The frogs raise their tadpoles in the security of the water-filled cup in the bromeliads' rosettes, allowing them to stay in the relative safety of the treetops and not have to venture to a pool on the ground where predators are likely much more numerous. Waste products from the frogs and their offspring, once deposited into the cup, are utilized by the plant for nourishment.

Subgenera
, the Encyclopaedia of Bromeliads recognized three subgenera:
 N. subg. Longipetalopsis Leme
 N. subg. Neoregelia
 N. subg. Protoregelia W.Till & Leme

A former subgenus, N. subg. Hylaeaicum, was elevated to the genus Hylaeaicum in 2021.

Species
, Plants of the World Online accepted the following species:

Neoregelia abendrothae L.B.Sm.
Neoregelia altocaririensis Leme & L.Kollmann
Neoregelia alvimii Roeth
Neoregelia amandae W.Weber
Neoregelia ampullacea (É.Morren) L.B.Sm.
Neoregelia angustibracteolata E.Pereira & Leme
Neoregelia angustifolia E.Pereira
Neoregelia atroviridifolia W.Weber & Roeth
Neoregelia azevedoi Leme
Neoregelia bahiana (Ule) L.B.Sm.
Neoregelia binotii (É.Morren) L.B.Sm.
Neoregelia bragarum (E.Pereira & L.B.Sm.) Leme
Neoregelia brevifolia L.B.Sm. & Reitz
Neoregelia brigadeirensis C.C.Paula & Leme
Neoregelia brownii Leme
Neoregelia burlemarxii Read (also spelt Neoregelia burle-marxii)
Neoregelia camorimiana E.Pereira & I.A.Penna
Neoregelia capixaba E.Pereira & Leme
Neoregelia carcharodon (Jacob-Makoy ex Wittm.) L.B.Sm.
Neoregelia carinata Leme
Neoregelia carolinae (Beer) L.B.Sm.
Neoregelia cathcartii C.F.Reed & Read
Neoregelia chlorosticta (É.Morren) L.B.Sm.
Neoregelia coimbrae E.Pereira & Leme
Neoregelia compacta (Mez) L.B.Sm.
Neoregelia concentrica (Vell.) L.B.Sm.
Neoregelia coriacea (Antoine) L.B.Sm.
Neoregelia correia-araujoi E.Pereira & I.A.Penna
Neoregelia crispata Leme
Neoregelia cruenta (Graham) L.B.Sm.
Neoregelia cyanea (Beer) L.B.Sm.
Neoregelia dactyloflammans Leme & L.Kollmann
Neoregelia dayvidiana Leme & A.P.Fontana
Neoregelia desenganensis Leme
Neoregelia diversifolia E.Pereira
Neoregelia doeringiana L.B.Sm.
Neoregelia dungsiana E.Pereira
Neoregelia eltoniana W.Weber
Neoregelia farinosa (Ule) L.B.Sm.
Neoregelia fluminensis L.B.Sm.
Neoregelia fosteriana L.B.Sm.
Neoregelia gavionensis Martinelli & Leme
Neoregelia gigas Leme & L.Kollmann
Neoregelia guttata Leme
Neoregelia hoehneana L.B.Sm.
Neoregelia ibitipocensis (Leme) Leme
Neoregelia ilhana Leme
Neoregelia indecora (Mez) L.B.Sm.
Neoregelia inexspectata Leme
Neoregelia insulana Leme
Neoregelia johannis (Carrière) L.B.Sm.
Neoregelia johnsoniae H.Luther
Neoregelia kautskyi E.Pereira
Neoregelia kerryi Leme (also spelt Neoregelia kerryae)
Neoregelia kuhlmannii L.B.Sm.
Neoregelia lactea H.Luther & Leme
Neoregelia laevis (Mez) L.B.Sm.
Neoregelia leprosa L.B.Sm.
Neoregelia leucophoea (Baker) L.B.Sm.
Neoregelia lilliputiana E.Pereira
Neoregelia lillyae W.Weber
Neoregelia longipedicellata Leme
Neoregelia longisepala E.Pereira & I.A.Penna
Neoregelia lymaniana R.Braga & Sucre
Neoregelia macahensis (Ule) L.B.Sm.
Neoregelia macrosepala L.B.Sm.
Neoregelia maculata L.B.Sm.
Neoregelia magdalenae L.B.Sm. & Reitz
Neoregelia marmorata (Baker) L.B.Sm.
Neoregelia martinellii W.Weber
Neoregelia mcwilliamsii L.B.Sm.
Neoregelia melanodonta L.B.Sm.
Neoregelia menescalii Leme
Neoregelia mucugensis Leme
Neoregelia nevaresii Leme & H.Luther
Neoregelia nivea Leme
Neoregelia odorata Leme
Neoregelia olens (Hook.f.) L.B.Sm.
Neoregelia oligantha L.B.Sm.
Neoregelia paratiensis Leme
Neoregelia pascoaliana L.B.Sm.
Neoregelia pauciflora L.B.Sm.
Neoregelia paulistana E.Pereira
Neoregelia pernambucana Leme & J.A.Siqueira
Neoregelia petropolitana Leme
Neoregelia pineliana (Lem.) L.B.Sm.
Neoregelia pontualii Leme
Neoregelia princeps (Baker) L.B.Sm.
Neoregelia punctatissima (Ruschi) Ruschi
Neoregelia retrorsa Leme & L.Kollmann
Neoregelia richteri W.Weber
Neoregelia roethii W.Weber
Neoregelia rothinessa Leme, H.Luther & W.Till
Neoregelia rubrifolia Ruschi
Neoregelia rubrovittata Leme
Neoregelia ruschii Leme & B.R.Silva
Neoregelia sanguinea Leme
Neoregelia sapiatibensis E.Pereira & I.A.Penna
Neoregelia sarmentosa (Regel) L.B.Sm.
Neoregelia schubertii Roeth
Neoregelia seideliana L.B.Sm. & Reitz
Neoregelia silvimontana Leme & J.A.Siqueira
Neoregelia simulans L.B.Sm.
Neoregelia smithii W.Weber
Neoregelia spectabilis (Antoine) L.B.Sm.
Neoregelia spiralipetala (Leme) Wand. & S.E.Martins
Neoregelia tenebrosa Leme
Neoregelia tigrina (Ruschi) Ruschi
Neoregelia tristis (Beer) L.B.Sm.
Neoregelia uleana L.B.Sm.
Neoregelia viridolineata Leme
Neoregelia viridovinosa Leme & L.Kollmann
Neoregelia watersiana Leme
Neoregelia wilsoniana M.B.Foster
Neoregelia zaslawskyi E.Pereira & Leme
Neoregelia zonata L.B.Sm.

Former species
Species transferred to Hylaeaicum include:
Neoregelia eleutheropetala  → Hylaeaicum eleutheropetalum (Ule) Leme & Forzza
Neoregelia leviana  → Hylaeaicum levianum (L.B.Sm.) Leme & Forzza
Neoregelia margaretae  → Hylaeaicum margaretae (L.B.Sm.) Leme & Forzza
Neoregelia mooreana  → Hylaeaicum mooreanum (L.B.Sm.) Leme, Zizka & Aguirre-Santoro
Neoregelia myrmecophila  → Hylaeaicum myrmecophilum (Ule) Leme & Forzza
Neoregelia pendula  → Hylaeaicum pendulum (L.B.Sm.) Leme, Zizka & Aguirre-Santoro
Neoregelia rosea  → Hylaeaicum roseum (L.B.Sm.) Leme, Zizka & Aguirre-Santoro
Neoregelia stolonifera → Hylaeaicum stoloniferum (L.B.Sm.) Leme, Zizka & Aguirre-Santoro

Gallery

References

External links

BSI Genera Gallery photos

 
Bromeliaceae genera
Flora of South America